The Office of the Solicitor General of the Philippines, formerly known as the Bureau of Justice, is an independent and autonomous office attached to the Department of Justice. The OSG is headed by Menardo Guevarra.

The Office of the Solicitor General is the "law firm" of the Republic of the Philippines. The Solicitor General is the principal law officer and legal defender of the Republic of the Philippines. He shall have the authority and responsibility for the exercise of the Office's mandate and for the discharge of its duties and functions, and shall have supervision and control over the Office and its constituent units. He also determines the legal position that the government will take in the courts and argues in virtually every case in which the government is a party. It is tasked to represent the people of the Philippines, the Philippine government, its agencies, instrumentalities, officials, and agents in any litigation, proceeding, or investigation before the Supreme Court and the Court of Appeals. When authorized by the President, he shall also represent government owned or controlled corporations.

History

Attorney General and Solicitor General
Act No. 136 dated June 11, 1901, which became effective on June 6, 1901, created the position now occupied by the Solicitor General. Under Section 40 of this Act, the Attorney General, as head of the Bureau of Justice, was vested with the powers and functions of today's Secretary of Justice. At the time, the Solicitor General was second only to the Attorney General in the office the former would eventually head. Appropriately, Section 41 of the Act required an "officer learned in the law" to assist the Attorney General. This law specifically provided that "it should be the special duty of the Solicitor General to conduct and argue suits and appeals in the Supreme Court, in which the Philippine Government is interested."

Meanwhile, a few months after the Bureau of Justice was created, Act No. 222 was passed, establishing the Department of Finance and Justice. The Bureau of Justice was placed under the supervision of a new department. Act No. 2666 would later divide the department into a Department of Justice and a Department of Finance. Under this law, the Attorney General and Solicitor General continued to represent the Government in the Supreme Court and lower courts.

Secretary of Justice
Act No. 4007 which was enacted in 1932 abolished the position of Attorney General. His functions were taken over by the Secretary of Justice. The Act also named the Solicitor General as the head of the Bureau of Justice. The Assistant Solicitor General, a position created by Act No. 683 of 1903, became second in command of the Bureau.

As a result of the rapidly burgeoning number of cases involving the Government, the Solicitor General after independence was constrained to concentrate on advocacy and court appearances. The functions which the Bureau of Justice used to have were gradually transferred to newly created offices and divisions of the Department of Justice.

Solicitor General
Executive Order No. 94 of 1947 renamed the Bureau of Justice as the Office of the Solicitor General. Subsequently, the legislature passed R. A. No. 335 in 1948 to confirm this change and to provide for a First Assistant Solicitor General who would be the second highest official in the Office.

A succession of laws relieved the Office of the Solicitor General of some of its burdens. Section 1660 of the old Administrative Code previously provided that the head of the Bureau of Justice "shall have general supervision and control over provincial and city fiscals (now prosecutors) and attorneys and over other prosecuting officer throughout the Philippines." The Office of Special Prosecutors, which the Solicitor General formerly headed, was later converted into a Division of Special Attorneys by R.A. No. 311 of 1948. The Office of the Government Corporate Counsel, which was headed by the Solicitor General under Executive Order No. 392 of 1950, became a separate office in the Department of Justice by virtue of R.A. No. 2327.

From a motley staff of one Solicitor General, an Assistant Solicitor General and a handful of assistant attorneys in the 1900s, the Office of the Solicitor General has grown throughout the years. In accordance with E.O No. 292, the Administrative Code of 1987, the Solicitor General was assisted by fifteen Assistant Solicitors General and more than a hundred Solicitors and Associate Solicitors, who are divided into fifteen divisions. In 2006, with the passing of Republic Act 9417 or the OSG Law, the Office has expanded to thirty (30) legal divisions with a corresponding increase in the general and administrative support personnel and provision for ample office space. Each lawyer at the OSG handles an average of 800 cases at any given time. Aside from the paper chase involved in appealed cases and original petitions before the Supreme Court and the Court of Appeals, a Solicitor General or Associate Solicitor has to match wits with the best lawyers of the country in countless trials."

Powers and functions
The Office of the Solicitor General has the following specific powers and functions:

 Represent the Government in the Supreme Court and the Court of Appeals in all criminal proceedings; represent the Government and its officers in the Supreme Court, the Court of Appeals, and all other courts or tribunals in all civil actions and special proceedings in which the Government or any officer thereof in his official capacity is a party.
 Investigate, initiate court action, or in any manner proceed against any person, corporation or firm for the enforcement of any contract, bond, guarantee, mortgage, pledge or other collateral executed in favor of the Government. Where proceedings are to be conducted outside of the Philippines the Solicitor General may employ counsel to assist in the discharge of the aforementioned responsibilities.
 Appear in any court in any action involving the validity of any treaty, law, executive order or proclamation, rule or regulation when in his judgment his intervention is necessary or when requested by the Court.
 Appear in all proceedings involving the acquisition or loss of Philippine citizenship.
 Represent the Government in all land registration and related proceedings. Institute actions for the reversion to the Government of lands of the public domain and improvements thereon as well as lands held in violation of the Constitution.
 Prepare, upon request of the President or other proper officer of the National Government, rules and guidelines for government entities governing the preparation of contracts, making of investments, undertaking of transactions, and drafting of forms or other writings needed for official use, with the end in view of facilitating their enforcement and insuring that they are entered into or prepared conformably with law and for the best interests of the public.
 Deputize, whenever in the opinion of the Solicitor General the public interest requires, any provincial or city fiscal to assist him in the performance of any function or discharge of any duty incumbent upon him, within the jurisdiction of the aforesaid provincial or city fiscal. When so deputized, the fiscal shall be under the control and supervision of the Solicitor General with regard to the conduct of the proceedings assigned to the fiscal, and he may be required to render reports or furnish information regarding the assignment.
 Deputize legal officers of government departments, bureaus, agencies and offices to assist the Solicitor General and appear or represent the Government in cases involving their respective offices, brought before the courts, and exercise supervision and control over such legal officers with respect to such cases.
 Call on any department, bureau, office, agency or instrumentality of the Government for such service, assistance and cooperation as may be necessary in fulfilling its functions and responsibilities and for this purpose enlist the services of any government official or employee in the pursuit of his tasks. Departments, bureaus, agencies, offices, instrumentalities and corporations to whom the Office of the Solicitor General renders legal services are authorized to disburse funds from their sundry operating and other funds for the latter Office. For this purpose, the Solicitor General and his staff are specifically authorized to receive allowances as may be provided by the Government offices, instrumentalities and corporations concerned, in addition to their regular compensation.
 Represent, upon the instructions of the President, the Republic of the Philippines in international litigations, negotiations or conferences where the legal position of the Republic must be defended or presented.
 Act and represent the Republic and/or the people before any court, tribunal, body or commission in any matter, action or proceeding which, in his opinion, affects the welfare of the people as the ends of justice may require; and
 Perform such other functions as may be provided by law.

Organizational structure
Under Republic Act No. 9417, there shall be at least thirty (30) legal divisions in the Office of the Solicitor General. Each division, permanently headed by an Assistant Solicitor General, shall consist of ten (10) lawyers and such other personnel as may be necessary for the office to effectively carry out its functions. Lawyers in the OSG hold the following ranks: Senior State Solicitor, State Solicitor II, State Solicitor I, Associate Solicitor III, Associate Solicitor II, and Associate Solicitor I. The law likewise dictates that the Solicitor General shall have a cabinet rank and the same qualifications for appointment, rank, prerogatives, salaries, allowances, benefits and privileges as the Presiding Justice of the Court of Appeals; an Assistant Solicitor General, those of an Associate Justice of the Court of Appeals.

The qualifications for appointment, rank, prerogatives, salaries, and privileges of Solicitors shall be the same as judges, specified as follows:
 Senior State Solicitor – Regional Trial Court Judge
 State Solicitor II – Metropolitan Trial Court Judge
 State Solicitor I – Municipal Trial Court in Cities Judge

List of attorneys general

List of solicitors general

See also
National Telecommunications Commission (NTC)
Movie and Television Review and Classification Board (MTRCB)
House of Representatives of the Philippines
Philippine House Committee on Legislative Franchises
ABS-CBN franchise renewal controversy

References

External links
Office of the Solicitor General

Department of Justice (Philippines)
Philippines